The 1982 All-Ireland Senior Club Camogie Championship for the leading clubs in the women's team field sport of camogie was won by Buffers Alley from Wexford, who defeated Athenry from Galway in the final, played at Birr. It was the second in a record sequence of four in a row won by the club.

Arrangements
The championship was organised on the traditional provincial system used in Gaelic Games since the 1880s, with Killeagh and Portglenone winning the championships of the other two provinces. Due to injury Pat Lenihan, Killeagh's star player, was unable to play in the third successive meeting in three years between Buffers Alley and Killeagh, this time at the semi-final stage. Alley's margin was one point before Dorothy Walsh doubled on a high ball from her sister, Elsie, for a late goal. Portglenone led Athenry by 1–4 to 1–1 at half time in the other semi-final, Teresa Dwane scored two goals early in the second half for Athenry and further goals from Anne Morris, Madge Hobbins and Marion Freaney secured a place in the final. Bronagh McIlvenna was the top scorer for Portglenone with 2–3. Goalkeeper, Sue Dillon, was Portglenone's star.

The Final
The final was played in heavy rain in Carrickmacross. Athenry's two points in the first six minutes were their only scores in the match, as goals from Dorothy Walsh and Kathleen Tonks secured the championship for Buffers Alley.

Final stages

References

External links
 Camogie Association

1982 in camogie
1982